Boubacar Kanté is a Malian American physicist and engineer working in the field of wave-matter interaction at the University of California, Berkeley, where he is the inaugural Chenming Hu Endowed Associate Professor of Electrical Engineering and Computer Sciences (EECS).. He is also faculty scientist at the Materials Sciences Division (MSD) of the Lawrence Berkeley National Laboratory. His research focuses on optical phenomena at a very small scale, developing nanostructures to harness the interaction of light and matter, such as metamaterials, scalable lasers, topological lasers, compact lenses, or energy harvesting nanostructures. He is mostly known for his demonstration of the world first topological laser, and his overcoming of a six-decade old challenge on the scaling of single-aperture lasers with a laser known as the Berkeley Surface Emitting Laser or BerkSEL.

Education 
Dr. Kanté received advanced graduate degree Electrical Engineering and Computer Science from Lille University of Science and Technology in France in 2006 and pursued a Ph.D in physics at the Centre for Nanosciences and Nanotechnologies of University of Paris-Saclay (formerly known as the Institute for Fundamental Electronics) which he received in 2010. He then joined UC Berkeley as a postdoctoral fellow in Xiang Zhang group, before moving to UC San Diego where he became an assistant and then associate professor. In 2019, he returned to UC Berkeley in the EECS department as an associate professor.

Awards and honors 
 2021 Bakar Fellowship
 2020 Moore Inventor Fellowship
 2017 Office of Naval Research Young Investigator Award
 2016 National Science Foundation (NSF) Career Award
 2015 Hellman fellowship
 2010 Richelieu Prize in Sciences

References

External links 
 

Year of birth missing (living people)
Living people
French physicists
Lille University of Science and Technology alumni
UC Berkeley College of Engineering faculty
Optical physicists
Metamaterials scientists